Tournehem-sur-la-Hem is a commune in the Pas-de-Calais department in the Hauts-de-France region of France.

Geography
Tournehem-sur-la-Hem is located 10 miles (16 km) northwest of Saint-Omer, at the D217 and D218 road junction, on the banks of the river Hem.

Population

Places of interest
 The church of Saint Médard, dating from the fifteenth, seventeenth and eighteenth century, now a historical monument.
 The ruins of the 12th-century château which was destroyed in 1542.
 The area also has some windmill's, such as the Moulin à vent Bacquet.
 The eighteenth-century château at Guémy.
 The church of Notre-Dame at Guémy, dating from the eighteenth century.
 The ruins of the 13th-century chapel of Guémy on Saint Louis Mount, which has extensive views of the area

See also
Communes of the Pas-de-Calais department

References

External links

 Regional Tourist Office website 

Tournehemsurlahem